Dixons Brooklands Academy, also known as DBA or DBK, is a mixed-sex secondary school in Wythenshawe, Manchester, England.

History
In 1957, two separate schools opened, West Wythenshawe Technical High School for Girls and West Wythenshawe Technical High School for Boys. The schools' facilities included sports fields, tennis courts, science labs and a library. A statue, commissioned by Mitzi Cunliffe, who designed the Bafta, was erected outside the boys' gymnasium. In 1967, the two schools merged to form Brookway High School comprehensive, with mixed classes.

In 2003, the school was then awarded sports college status and renamed Brookway High School and Sports College. Following this, a £3 million facility was built on the site, featuring two sports halls, three classrooms and a large gym, for use by both the school and the local community.

Closure and rebuild
In 2009, Manchester City Council invested almost £200 million to improve the schools in the Manchester area. The original Brookway High School and Sports College/Manchester Health Academy building was demolished and a new £20 million building for Manchester Health Academy was completedin 2010.

In July 2008, Barry Burke, the headteacher at Rhyddings Business and Enterprise School in Oswaldtwistle, was appointed Principal of Manchester Health Academy, taking up his post in January 2009. In August 2013, he retired from his position, being succeeded by Damien Owen.

Following poor results and negative Ofsted inspections, in January 2022 Manchester Health Academy became part of the Dixons Academy Trust and was renamed Dixons Brooklands Academy.

Facilities
The academy was built with less traditional teaching methods in mind. It features three large learning zones, each of which can be used to teach up to four classes, and two smaller learning zones that can each be used by up to two classes. Eight traditional-style classrooms host practical subjects such as science, design, technology, cooking, music, ICT, drama, art and dance. The school states that the learning zones are large enough accommodate 150 students per year group at a time, producing a theoretical maximum student count of 750 plus 150 maximum for the sixth-form centre. The centre is operated in partnership with The Manchester College, and currently offers courses in business, health and social care, sport, IT, forensic science, and early years education and care.

The Academy also features a public library, which is operated by Manchester Library & Information Service.

In 2016, Manchester City Council invited the school to expand its student population. A £10 million transformation of the school's estate saw the addition of a new dining room extension, multi-use games area and FA-standard all-weather pitch, together with a new maths and English building.

Former Manchester United footballer Denis Irwin officially opened the school's new all-weather pitch in November 2017. The new floodlit playing surface complements the school's existing sports facilities.

Notable former pupils

Brookway High School
 Billy Duffy, guitarist of The Cult

References

Academies in Manchester
Secondary schools in Manchester
2009 establishments in England
Educational institutions established in 2009